Keith Roland Matthews,   (born 24 June 1964) is a British cell biologist and parasitologist, currently Professor of Parasite Biology in the School of Biological Sciences at the University of Edinburgh. His research focuses on African trypanosomes (protozoan parasites spread by the tsetse fly), which cause human sleeping sickness and the equivalent cattle disease nagana.

Early life and career 

Matthews took a B.Sc. in biology (1986) at Brunel University, followed by a Ph.D. in genetics (1990) at the University of Glasgow, working with David Barry on metacyclic variant surface glycoprotein (VSG) regulation in Trypanosoma brucei rhodesiense. In 1990, he became NATO Fellow (Epidemiology and Public Health) at Yale University before moving to the University of Manchester in 1992, where he set up his own laboratory four years later. In 2004, he relocated to the University of Edinburgh, where he has been Professor of Parasite Biology since 2007. He is also Director of the Centre for Immunity, Infection, and Evolution (CIIE), Head of Institute for Immunology and Infection Research (IIIR), and a Wellcome Trust Senior Investigator.

Research interests 

Matthews researches African trypanosomes and how these parasites communicate to optimize their survival and transmission. In particular, he has researched how trypanosomes change from a "slender" form (to increase parasitaemia) into a "stumpy" form that is better adapted for transmission to and survival in tsetse flies.

Awards 

Matthews was awarded the 2008 British Society for Parasitology C. A. Wright Memorial Medal and the 2015 Sanofi Pasteur International Research Award for his contributions to infectious disease research. He was elected Fellow of the Royal Society of Edinburgh in 2014, Fellow of the Academy of Medical Sciences in 2018, and Fellow of the Royal Society in 2020. According to his Academy of Medical Sciences citation, Matthews' work "has led to fundamental breakthroughs in our understanding of the molecular mechanisms that control trypanosome transmission and virulence".

Selected publications

References

External links
 

Living people
1964 births
Alumni of Brunel University London
Academics of the University of Edinburgh
British biologists